Granzotto is an Italian surname. Notable people with the surname include:

Claudio Granzotto (1900–1947), Italian Franciscan friar and sculptor
Gianni Granzotto (1914–1985), Italian writer, journalist, and war correspondent

Italian-language surnames